The Northern Quarter is the central business district of Brussels, Belgium. Like La Défense in Paris, the Docklands in London or the Zuidas in Amsterdam, the Northern Quarter consists of a concentrated collection of high-rise buildings where many Belgian and multinational companies have their headquarters.

The Northern Quarter roughly covers the area between Willebroek Quay, railways along Brussels-North railway station and the northern side of the Small Ring (Brussels' inner ring road). The territory is thus split between the municipalities of Saint-Josse-ten-Noode, Schaerbeek and the City of Brussels.

Over half of the twenty tallest buildings in Belgium are located in the Northern Quarter. It has an additional 8,000 residents.

History

Origins
The area of what is today the Northern Quarter was first planned in the middle of the 19th century. Between 1850 and 1890, the north of Brussels heavily benefitted from industrialisation with the opening of / railway station, as well as the industries along the Brussels–Charleroi Canal (the future Port of Brussels). This first station was replaced in March 1846 by a new monumental station, Brussels-North railway station, on the Place Charles Rogier/Karel Rogierplein, a short distance east from the original site, on the territory of the municipality of Saint-Josse-ten-Noode.

Attracted by the industrial opportunities, many inhabitants settled in the area, first from the other Belgian provinces (mainly rural residents from Flanders) and France, then from Southern European, and more recently from Eastern European and African countries. Populated mainly by workers, the district was very popular, and had a very strong cultural identity. It was thus decided then to lay out new orthogonal streets on the axes of the / and the / to accommodate this growing populace.

The Northern Quarter has the particularity of straddling three municipalities (Saint-Josse-ten-Noode, Schaerbeek and the City of Brussels). The boundary between the three municipalities meandered like the bed of the Senne river, which was belatedly vaulted in this northern district. It is wedged between the North Station, Brussels' historic city centre (the Pentagon) and the canal.

1960s to present

The neighbourhood, deemed unhealthy, was largely razed in the 1960s at the end of the largest expropriation campaign that marked the history of Brussels. The so-called Manhattan Project was born (not to be confused with the World War II project of the same name). The construction plan was approved on 17 February 1967 by the then Prime Minister Paul Vanden Boeynants.

The creation of the business district was controversial. The demolition of a built-up and occupied residential area around the North Station was not universally appreciated. Over 15,000 residents were forced out for this purpose. Shortly after the first rows of residences were demolished, an economic crisis struck, leaving an urban void. It was so decried that, in 1989, the newly created Brussels-Capital Region tried to remedy the problem by giving the town planning of the district a more human side. The area has since filled up with skyscrapers around the / and the /.

The first towers were completed in the 1970s and include the World Trade Center (WTC) 1 and 2. The TBR Tower and the WTC 3 followed in the 1980s. At the same time, the first residents of the Northern Residence were also able to move in. After a lull in building in the 1990s (with the exception of the Proximus Towers in 1994), projects resumed in the 2000s: the North Galaxy Towers (2004), the Ellipse building (2006) and the Covent Garden (2007). The  Rogier Tower, completed in 2006, gave more character to the skyline. The Zenith Tower also anchors the perspective of the boulevard on its northern end. Now that the area is an established business district, more and more companies, in addition to federal and regional administrations, have offices in the district.

Notable buildings

Current buildings

Former buildings

See also

 Brusselisation
 History of Brussels

References

Notes

Bibliography
 
 

Neighbourhoods of Brussels
Economy of Brussels
Saint-Josse-ten-Noode
Schaerbeek
Financial districts
Central business districts